Riccardo Innocenti is an Italian name, may refer to:
Riccardo Innocenti (footballer born 1943), active in Serie A and Serie B
Riccardo Innocenti (footballer born 1974), active in Serie C